Nico Pulzetti (born 13 February 1984) is an Italian footballer who plays as a midfielder for Sandonà.

He also played for Cesena, Castelnuovo, Verona, Livorno, Bari, Chievo and Siena.

Club career
Pulzetti was signed by A.S. Livorno Calcio from Hellas Verona F.C. for €1.5 million in 2007.

On 29 June 2011, Pulzetti was signed by Bologna for €3.3 million, with half of the fee paid via Riccardo Regno. He signed a four-year contract worth about €320,000 net annually, plus bonuses. He played a full season with Bologna in 2011–12, but appeared only occasionally the following season. He spent the 2013–14 season on loan at Serie B club Siena, and returned to his first club, Cesena, for 2014–15, also on loan.

On 7 January 2016, Pulzetti was signed by Spezia for an undisclosed fee.

On 4 July 2019, he moved to Eccellenza side Sandonà.

References

External links
 

1984 births
Living people
Sportspeople from the Province of Rimini
Italian footballers
Association football midfielders
A.C. Cesena players
Hellas Verona F.C. players
U.S. Livorno 1915 players
S.S.C. Bari players
A.C. ChievoVerona players
Bologna F.C. 1909 players
A.C.N. Siena 1904 players
Calcio Padova players
Serie B players
Serie A players
Serie C players
Footballers from Emilia-Romagna